Jens Teutrine (born 1993) is a German politician of the Free Democratic Party (FDP) who has been serving as a member of the Bundestag since the 2021 German federal election, representing the Herford – Minden-Lübbecke II district. From 2020 until 2021 he served as the chairman of the party’s youth organisation, the Young Liberals (Julis).

Early life and education 
As of 2020, Teutrine studies philosophy and social sciences at Bielefeld University.

Political career 
Teutrine was elected to the board of the Free Democratic Party in 2021.

In the negotiations to form a so-called traffic light coalition of the Social Democratic Party (SPD), the Green Party and the FDP following the 2021 federal elections, Teutrine was part of his party's delegation in the working group on children, youth and families, co-chaired by Serpil Midyatli, Katrin Göring-Eckardt and Stephan Thomae.

In parliament, Teutrine has been serving on the Committee on Labour and Social Affairs and the Parliamentary Advisory Board on Sustainable Development since 2022.

References 

1993 births
21st-century German politicians
Members of the Bundestag 2021–2025
Members of the Bundestag for the Free Democratic Party (Germany)
Living people
Members of the Bundestag for North Rhine-Westphalia
Bielefeld University alumni